is a Japanese competitor in synchronized swimming.

She won 2 bronze medals at the 2017 World Aquatics Championships, 4 gold medals at the 2016 Asian Swimming Championships, and a silver medal at the 2018 Asian Games.

References

Living people
Japanese synchronized swimmers
1996 births
World Aquatics Championships medalists in synchronised swimming
Sportspeople from Kyoto Prefecture
Synchronized swimmers at the 2017 World Aquatics Championships
Kindai University alumni
Asian Games silver medalists for Japan
Medalists at the 2018 Asian Games
Artistic swimmers at the 2018 Asian Games
Asian Games medalists in artistic swimming
Artistic swimmers at the 2019 World Aquatics Championships
Synchronized swimmers at the 2020 Summer Olympics
Olympic synchronized swimmers of Japan
21st-century Japanese women